Re:Mix Momentum is the second album and first remix album released by Christian artist TobyMac. Re:Mix Momentum contains remixes of ten of the songs on Momentum (2001). It was released on June 12, 2003, through ForeFront Records.

Track listing

Charts

References

TobyMac albums
2003 remix albums
ForeFront Records remix albums